Simm may refer to:

 SIMM (single in-line memory module), a type of memory module used in computers
 Simm (hill), a hill in the British Isles that is over 600 m high and has a prominence of at least 30 m
 Simm (surname)

See also
Sim (disambiguation)